A cooling flow occurs according to the theory that the intracluster medium (ICM) in the centres of galaxy clusters should be rapidly cooling at the rate of tens to thousands of solar masses per year. This should happen as the ICM (a plasma) is quickly losing its energy by the emission of X-rays. The X-ray brightness of the ICM is proportional to the square of its density, which rises steeply towards the centres of many clusters. Also the temperature falls to typically a third or a half of the temperature in the outskirts of the cluster. The typical [predicted] timescale for the ICM to cool is relatively short, less than a billion years. As material in the centre of the cluster cools out, the pressure of the overlying ICM should cause more material to flow inwards (the cooling flow).

In a steady state, the rate of mass deposition, i.e. the rate at which the plasma cools, is given by 

where L is the bolometric (i.e. over the entire spectrum) luminosity of the cooling region, T is its temperature, k is the Boltzmann constant and μm is the mean molecular mass.

Cooling flow problem
It is currently thought that the very large amounts of expected cooling are in reality much smaller, as there is little evidence for cool X-ray emitting gas in many of these systems. This is the cooling flow problem. Theories for why there is little evidence of cooling include
 Heating by the central Active galactic nucleus (AGN) in clusters, possibly via sound waves (seen in the Perseus and Virgo clusters)
 Thermal conduction of heat from the outer parts of clusters
 Cosmic ray heating
 Hiding cool gas by absorbing material
 Mixing of cool gas with hotter material
Heating by AGN is the most popular explanation, as they emit a lot of energy over their lifetimes, and some of the alternatives listed have theoretical problems.

See also
List of plasma physics articles

References

Further reading

5.7. Cooling flows and accretion by cDs (in X-ray Emission from Clusters of Galaxies. Sarazin 1988)

Extragalactic astronomy
Space plasmas